Pakhwal is a village located in Gujrat District in Pakistan. 

Populated places in Jhelum District